Bilari is one of the 403 Legislative Assembly constituencies of Uttar Pradesh state in India.

It is part of Moradabad district.

Members of Legislative Assembly

Election results

2022

2017

See also
 List of constituencies of the Uttar Pradesh Legislative Assembly
 Moradabad district

References

 http://eci.nic.in/eci_main/StatisticalReports/SE_1951/StatRep_51_UP.pdf
 http://eci.nic.in/eci_main/StatisticalReports/SE_1957/StatRep_UP_1957.pdf
 http://eci.nic.in/eci_main/statisticalreports/SE_1962/StatRep_UP_1962.pdf
 http://eci.nic.in/eci_main/StatisticalReports/AE2012/Stats_Report_UP2012.pdf

External links
 

Moradabad district
Assembly constituencies of Uttar Pradesh